Networks and Heterogeneous Media is a peer-reviewed academic journal published quarterly by the American Institute of Mathematics and sponsored by the Istituto per le applicazioni del calcolo. The journal was established in 2006 and focuses on networks, heterogeneous media, and related fields. The editor-in-chief is Benedetto Piccoli (Rutgers University).

Abstracting and indexing 
The journal is abstracted and indexed in Zentralblatt MATH, MathSciNet, Scopus, Current Contents/Physical, Chemical & Earth Sciences, and Science Citation Index Expanded. According to the Journal Citation Reports, the journal has a 2013 impact factor of 0.952.

References

External links 
 

Mathematics journals
Publications established in 2006
Quarterly journals
English-language journals
Academic journals published by learned and professional societies